Santa Barbara Honeymoon is the tenth album by Scottish folk musician Bert Jansch, released in 1975.

Track listing
All tracks composed by Bert Jansch; except where indicated
"Love Anew"
"Mary and Joseph"
"Be My Friend"
"Baby Blue"
"Dance Lady Dance"
"You Are My Sunshine" (Jimmie Davis, Charles Mitchell)
"Lost and Gone"
"Blues Run the Game" (Jackson C. Frank)
"Build Another Band"
"When the Teardrops Fell"
"Dynamite"
"Buckrabbit"

2009 Remaster
Same as the original LP release, with the following bonus tracks:

"Build Another Band" (Alternate Version)
"When The Teardrops Fell" (Live at Montreux 4 July 1975)
"Lady Nothing" (Live at Montreux 4 July 1975)
"Dance Lady Dance" (Live at Montreux 4 July 1975)
"Angie" (Live at Montreux 4 July 1975)
"One for Jo" (Live at Montreux 4 July 1975)

Personnel
Bert Jansch - vocals, guitars
Jim Baker - guitar
Jay Lacy - electric guitar
Bill Smith - keyboards
David Barry - keyboards
George Seymour - synthesizer
Robert Greenidge - steel drums
Don Whaley - bass
Ernie McDaniel - bass
David Hungate - bass
Danny Lane - drums
Tris Imboden - drums
Craig Buhler, Darrell Leonard, Jim Gordon - brass
Beth Fitchet Wood, Ron McGuire, Steve Wood - vocals
Technical
Bill Drescher, Chris Houston - engineer
Phyliss Nesmith - production coordinator

References

Bert Jansch albums
1975 albums
Charisma Records albums
Albums recorded at Sound City Studios